Eden Royce is a black gothic horror writer from Charleston, South Carolina. She references the local Gullah-Geechee culture in her writing. As a short story writer her work has appeared in anthologies and magazines such as Apex Magazine, Strange Horizons, as well as two collections of her work. She is also known for writing articles and reviews. In 2016 Royce was awarded the Diverse Worlds Grant by The Speculative Fiction Foundation. She is married and living in Kent, England.

Bibliography

 Collections
 Spook Lights: Southern Gothic Horror (2015)
 Spook Lights II: Southern Gothic Horror (2017)

 Anthologies
 Forever Vacancy: A Colors in Darkness Anthology (2017) with Mya Lairis and Kenya Moss-Dyme

 Short fiction

 9 Mystery Rose (2010)
 Finger Food (2010)
 With the Turn of a Key (2010)
 The Omega File (2011) with Darin Kennedy
 Red Sun, Autumn Rose (2011)
 Devil's Playground (2011)
 Infernal Proposal (2011)
 Hag Ride (2011)
 Rhythm (2013)
 The Death Bringer (2013)
 Voodooesque (2015)
 Doc Buzzard's Coffin (2015)
 Hand of Glory (2015)
 Homegoing (2015)
 Path of the War Chief (2015)
 Since Hatchet Was a Hammer (2015)
 The Choking Kind (2015)
 The Watered Soul (2015)
 Basque of the Red Death (2015)
 Graverobbing Negress Seeks Employment (2017)
 A Long Way from the Ritz (2017)
 Blood Read (2017)
 Carolina Blue (2017)
 Chilly Bears - 10¢ (2017)
 Folk (2017)
 Grandmother's Bed (2017)
 Haints of Azalea Hall (2017)
 The Dating Pool (2017)
 The Laughter of Crows (2017)
 The Mermaid Storm (2017)
 The Strange Dowry of Spinster Pumpkin (2017)
 To-Do List (2017)
 Sweetgrass Blood (2017)
 Soupie's Lover (2017)
 Crickets Sing for Naomi (2017)
 Shine, Blackberry Wine (2017)
 A Cure for Ghosts (2017)
 Caretaker (2018)
 Every Good-bye Ain't Gone (2018)
 For Southern Girls When the Zodiac Ain't Near Enough (2018)
 One If by Sea (2018)
 Witches for Mars (2019)

 Novels
 Root Magic

References and sources

21st-century American women writers
Writers from Charleston, South Carolina
People from Kent
Year of birth missing (living people)
Living people